Megalophycita is a monotypic snout moth genus described by Hans Georg Amsel in 1953. Its single species, Megalophycita albicostella, described by the same author, is found in Mauritania.

References

Taxa named by Hans Georg Amsel
Phycitinae
Monotypic moth genera
Moths of Africa
Pyralidae genera